John Isner was the defending of champion, but he chose not to participate this year.Brian Dabul won in the final, after Robby Ginepri retired at the score of 6–4, 0–4.

Seeds

Draw

Finals

Top half

Bottom half

References
Main Draw
Qualifying Singles

2010 ATP Challenger Tour
2010 Singles